Modern yoga gurus are people widely acknowledged to be gurus of modern yoga in any of its forms, whether religious or not. The role implies being well-known and having a large following; in contrast to the old guru-shishya tradition, the modern guru-follower relationship is not secretive, not exclusive, and does not necessarily involve a tradition. Many such gurus, but not all, teach a form of yoga as exercise; others teach forms which are more devotional or meditational; many teach a combination. Some have been affected by scandals of various kinds.

Guru-shishya tradition

Before the creation of modern yoga, hatha yoga was practised in secret by solitary, ascetic yogins, learning the tradition as a long-term pupil or shishya apprenticed to their master or guru. The ancient relationship was the primary means by which spirituality was expressed in India. Traditional yoga was often exclusive and secretive: the shishya submitted to and obeyed the guru, understanding that lengthy initiation and training under the guru was essential for progress. So strong was the guru-shishya relationship that Vivekananda stated that "The guru must be worshipped as God. He is God, he is nothing less than that".

Transformed role 

The role of the guru in the modern world is radically transformed. Globalisation has extended the guru's reach into environments where they may be a stranger, and where the religion, purpose, and status of the guru is poorly understood. Modern yoga practices are often open to everyone, without any sort of initiation into any organisation or doctrine. The modern guru Jaggi Vasudev explicitly rejected "all that traditional whatever"; all the same, some yoga traditions still emphasise and respect a teacher's lineage (parampara). For example, Gurumayi's Siddha Yoga pays careful attention to her predecessors, Muktananda and Bhagawan Nityananda. Another major change was introduced by Vivekananda; his Ramakrishna Mission set the example of public service in education and medicine, something now practised by many other Indian religious movements. These religions thus shifted from a focus on personal salvation to public altruism. 

A further radical shift was from spiritual to physical in yoga as exercise, as pioneered by Yogendra, Kuvalayananda, and Krishnamacharya. The transformed role of the guru can be seen in the case of one of these pioneers, Yogendra, who explicitly rejected the role of traditional guru for a single pupil or shishya. The physical context, too, is transformed along with the nature of the teacher's authority; yoga as exercise is often taught in an urban yoga studio, where the instructor's yoga teacher training stands in for the old guru-shishya relationship. The trend away from authority is continued in post-lineage yoga, which is practised outside any major school or guru's lineage.

The concept of the guru, along with mantra and meditation, reached the West in the 1960s with The Beatles' trip to India, for a Transcendental Meditation training course at Maharishi Mahesh Yogi's ashram in Rishikesh. Modern gurus since then have used the divine status of the traditional guru to claim that they were gods or goddesses. Some asserted they were avatars, earthly incarnations of a god, fulfilling the prophecy in the Bhagavad Gita that Vishnu would take on earthly form when the world was threatened by evil.

Abuse 

The potential for abuse in the transformed guru-follower relationship is large, and there have been multiple instances of apparent or proven sexual, mental, and emotional abuse by gurus. Anthony Storr has documented, for example, the excesses of Bhagwan Shree Rajneesh; Joel Kramer and Diana Alstad have examined the betrayal of trust that is involved.

Swami Vivekananda said early in the modern era that there are many incompetent gurus, and that a true guru should understand the spirit of the scriptures, have a pure character and be free from sin, and should be selfless, without desire for money and fame.

Following the downfalls of several gurus accused of misconduct, practitioners have publicly debated whether gurus are still necessary. 

As for how gurus can get away with abuse for so long, there is evidence both from research in psychology and from the recollections of former devotees like Daniel Shaw, once a senior member of staff in Gurumayi's Siddha Yoga organisation, that even if a guru is seen to be lying, devotees will ignore the matter and "keep on believing".

Acknowledged gurus

References

Sources